Stolen Sweets is a 1934 American comedy film directed by Richard Thorpe and written by Karl Brown. The film stars Sally Blane, Charles Starrett, Jameson Thomas, Claude King, John Harron and Polly Ann Young. The film was released on March 15, 1934, by Chesterfield Pictures.

Plot

Cast          
Sally Blane as Patricia Belmont
Charles Starrett as Bill Smith
Jameson Thomas as Barrington Thorne
Claude King as Henry Belmont
John Harron as Sam Ragland
Polly Ann Young as Betty Harkness
Tom Ricketts as Stoner
Aggie Herring as The Cook
Jane Keckley as Priscilla Prattleigh
Goodee Montgomery as Mrs. Barrington Thorne
Maynard Holmes as Phil Saunders

References

External links
 

1934 films
1930s English-language films
American comedy films
1934 comedy films
Chesterfield Pictures films
Films directed by Richard Thorpe
American black-and-white films
1930s American films